Telly may refer to:

 A colloquial term for television
 Telly Monster on Sesame Street
 Telly Awards, annual awards which honor excellence in video and television across all screens
 Indian Telly Awards
 Telly (home entertainment server), a range of computer systems
 Telly Inc, American video discovery platform company
 Telly, the third MGM lion
 An abbreviated name for the Fender Telecaster guitar

People
 Telly Hughes, American sportscaster
 Telly Leung (born 1980), American actor, singer, and songwriter
 Telly Savalas (1922–1994), American actor